is a Nippon Professional Baseball player for the Saitama Seibu Lions in Japan's Pacific League.

References

External links

1983 births
Japanese baseball players
Living people
Saitama Seibu Lions players
Seibu Lions players
Baseball people from Kobe